Birahim Diop (born February 7, 1979 in Thiès) is a Senegalese footballer.

Club career
Diop began his career in Senegal with US Rail de Thiès. In one year at the club he appeared in 25 matches scoring 15 goals. He then moved to ASC Jeanne d'Arc and scored 12 goals and added 7 assists in his one year at the club. In 2001 Diop moved to the United States and joined the MetroStars reserve squad, after impressing coach Octavio Zambrano he moved up to the senior squad appearing in 4 league matches in 2002. Following his stay in New York, Diop would join Colombian side Deportivo Pereira, before being re-united once again with coach Zambrano at CS Tiligul-Tiras Tiraspol in Moldova. In his first season with CS Tiligul-Tiras Tiraspol Diop appeared in 15 league matches and scored 3 goals playing as a holding midfielder. In 2008 Diop returned to the United States and played for FDR United in New York City's amateur leagues, scoring 19 goals in 25 matches.

On March 17, 2010, Kansas City Wizards officially announced the signing of Diop, as an addition to their midfield. Diop was reunited with coach Octavio Zambrano, an assistant for Kansas City who was instrumental in bringing Diop back to Major League Soccer. Diop scored his first two MLS goals on August 21, 2010 in a 4-1 victory over New England Revolution. Diop then recorded the first hat trick of his career on October 23, 2010 in a 4-1 victory over San Jose Earthquakes. Diop enjoyed his best year in Major League soccer in 2010 with Kansas City Wizards appearing in 14 league matches and scoring 5 goals.

Diop was waived by Kansas City on March 26, 2012.

Personal
Diop has a U.S. green card, granting him permanent residence in the United States and qualifying him as a domestic player for MLS roster purposes.

References

External links

moldova.sports.md
eurofotbal.info

1979 births
Living people
Senegalese footballers
Sporting Kansas City players
New York Red Bulls players
Deportivo Pereira footballers
ASC Jeanne d'Arc players
Expatriate soccer players in the United States
Major League Soccer players
Association football midfielders
US Rail players
Sportspeople from Thiès